Jagadevpet is a village in Velgatoor mandal , Karimnagar district, Telangana, South India. Its population is around 4,000 people. The main occupation of the community is agricultural labour in paddy, groundnut and corn fields. 

Jagadevpet has a government school teaching children up to the age of seven years. There is no public transportation to and from the village so villagers must rely on private transport.

References

Villages in Karimnagar district